Michael William "Gebi" Gebhardt (born November 25, 1965) is a former professional and Olympic windsurfer from the United States, who competed in five consecutive Summer Olympics, in the Olympic sailing discipline/event of windsurfing. He was born in Columbus, Ohio.

In the summer of 1981, at the age of 15, Gebhardt learned to windsurf in his back yard in Fort Walton Beach, Florida. Living on Okaloosa Islands waterfront, Gebi spent most of his adolescent days in the water; swimming, surfing, waterskiing, freediving, fishing and sailing Hobie beach cats and weekend cruising on his dad's 50 foot all wooden schooner, The Pele. When Gebi's younger brother Jon sailed home on a windsurfer, Gebhardt knew he had found the perfect wind and wave powered sport to take his love of the ocean to the next level.

His Olympic career started in 1984, with the 17-year-old grom windsurfer finishing 3rd in the 1984 L.A. US Olympic Trials; only the winner, Scott Steele earned the right to represent the US in the first ever Olympic Windsurfing medal Event, which was now part of Olympic yachting for the first time in Olympic history. Gebhardt was Scott Steele's- (1984 Olympic Windsurfing Silver medalist); training partner and was instrumental in Scott winning the USA's first Olympic Windsurfing Medal. In Los Angeles, Stephan van den Berg of the Netherlands won the gold medal and Bruce Kendall of New Zealand won the bronze medal.

"Gebi" as he is known to friends, competed in the 1984 Olympic Exhibition Windsurfing Event, which ran alongside the first ever Olympic windsurfing medal event. Gebhardt finished 5th in the Olympic Exhibition event which showcased windsurfing's other disciplines, besides course racing; including slalom, long-distance racing and longboard freestyle on the original windsurfer brand board.

At the 1988 US Olympic Trials, Gebhardt won the right to represent the US in the 1988 Seoul Korea Summer Olympics, in a very stormy high wind regatta, Gebhardt survived the 45 knot puffs in the last race to win his first Olympic Medal, a Bronze. After the 1988 Olympics, Gebhardt turned Pro, and joined the PWA (Professional Windsurfers Association) and competed in PWA World Cup events as a professional windsurfer. Gebhardt, a consummate tuner of gear, also ran hundreds of tech talk clinics and wrote technical "How To" coaching articles for Windsurfing magazines when not testing/developed windsurfing gear for his sponsors and enjoyed helping to modernize the sports equipment through constant innovation.

In Gebhardt's third Olympics, the 1992 Barcelona Summer Olympics, winning the regatta going into the last race, Gebi ended up losing the gold medal by .4 of a point, to reigning World Champion Franck David of France, ultimately winning his second Olympic Medal, a silver medal. Gebi had to beat both the 1984 Olympic Gold Medalist Stephan van Den Berg and 1988 Olympic Gold Medalist (and 1984 Olympic Bronze Medalist) Bruce Kendall to secure his second Olympic Medal.

Gebhardt competed in two more Olympics, the 1996 Atlanta Summer Olympics, finishing 6th, as well as his last Olympic Games in Sydney, Australia's 2000 Summer Olympics, where he finished 11th.

Gebhardt, one of the most winning American windsurfers of all time, competed in over 310 competitions in over 55 countries worldwide, amassed 6 World Championship Titles, 23 National Championship Titles, Pan Am Games Gold, Silver and bronze medals and won over 200 contests in racing, slalom and freestyle and holds the World Record for kiting across from Ft. Lauderdale, FL to Bimini Island in the Bahamas covering over 60 mile of open ocean in 3.5 hours while kiteboarding with teammate Kent Marinkovich.

Known for being one of the most technical coaches in windsurfing, Gebhardt's Olympic legacy includes developing/testing and overseeing the selection of the RSX Windsurf Olympic board and rig for ISAF. The RSX has been used in Olympic Windsurfing since 2008 Olympics. The current 2020 Tokyo Olympic Windsurfing equipment will be the Neil Pryde RSX Windsurfer gear as well and switches to windsurf foil racing at the 2024 Olympics. Gebhardt competed in the first ever "X Games" has been a guest on the LATE NIGHT WITH DAVID LETTERMAN SHOW and was a guest athlete on MTV Sports show with Pamela Anderson and honored to be photographed by Annie Liebovitz.

After retiring from his 5th Olympics in 2000, Gebi started his Olympic Windsurf coaching career, culminating in coaching Olympic Gold Medalist Gal Fridman, Israel's only Olympic Gold Medalist, at the 2004 Athens Olympics. Gebhardt has coached Olympic athletes from more than 25 countries.

Elite Kite coaching since 2005, Gebhardt was politically instrumental in helping to bring kitesurfing into the Olympic family, campaigning with the likes or Richard Branson and Bill Tai to entice the IOC (International Olympic Committee) on putting Kitesurfing into the Summer Olympic Games and Youth Olympic Games. Kiting will debut as a Summer Olympic Medal event in the 2024 Paris Summer Olympics, where kite foil racing will be the discipline. Coach Gebi has worked with dozens of aspiring pro and Olympic kitesurfers: including World Speed Record holder Robbie Douglas to multiple world championship titles in kitesurfing and breaking/holding Sailing's Outright World Speed Record.

In kite foilboard racing coach Gebhardt has coached World Champions Daniela Moroz and Nico Parlier, besides coaching 2 athletes at the 2018 Youth Olympic Games in Kitesurfing Twin Tip Racing- USA's Cameron Maramenides 4th Place and Antigua's Tiger Tyson who finished 8th. Gebhardt also trained Youth Olympic Silver Medalist, Philippines Christian Tio and also supported Dominican Republic's Youth Olympic Gold medalist Deury Corniel.

References

External links
 
 

1965 births
Living people
American windsurfers
American male sailors (sport)
Olympic silver medalists for the United States in sailing
Olympic bronze medalists for the United States in sailing
Sailors at the 1984 Summer Olympics – Windglider
Sailors at the 1988 Summer Olympics – Division II
Sailors at the 1992 Summer Olympics – Lechner A-390
Sailors at the 1996 Summer Olympics – Mistral One Design
Sailors at the 2000 Summer Olympics – Mistral One Design
Medalists at the 1988 Summer Olympics
Medalists at the 1992 Summer Olympics
Pan American Games silver medalists for the United States
Pan American Games bronze medalists for the United States
Pan American Games medalists in sailing
Sailors at the 1995 Pan American Games
Sailors at the 1999 Pan American Games
Medalists at the 1995 Pan American Games
Medalists at the 1999 Pan American Games
Sportspeople from Columbus, Ohio